USS LSM-135 was a  built for the United States Navy during World War II. Like many of her class, she was not named and is properly referred to by her hull designation.

She was laid down on 13 March 1944, at the Charleston Navy Yard, launched on 23 April 1944, and commissioned as USS LSM-135 on 31 May 1944.

Service history

Philippines
LSM-135 was assigned to the Asiatic-Pacific Theater and participated in the Leyte operation, which included Leyte landings, 20 October 1944, and Ormoc Bay landings, 7 to 8 December 1944.   She also participated in additional Philippine landings at Luzon and at Lingayen Gulf on 9 January 1945.

Okinawa, kamikaze strike
LSM-135 participated in the Assault and occupation of Okinawa Gunto in April and May 1945. While operating at Okinawa she was sunk by kamikaze attack off the Ryukyu Islands, 25 May 1945 at approximately 0830 hours. LSM-135 had only been in service 11 months and 25 days. At the time of her sinking LSM-135 was picking up survivors from the minesweeper  when it also was hit by kamikaze attack and burst into flames. The destroyer escort  rescued twenty survivors of the high speed transport , which was sinking from two kamikaze hits, and eleven survivors from LSM-135.

LSM-135 was struck from the Naval Register (date unknown).

Final Disposition, hulk donated, 10 July 1957, to the Government of the Ryukyu Islands, fate unknown.

LSM-135 earned three battle stars for World War II service

See also
 Landing craft
 Battle of Okinawa
 Battle of Leyte

References

External links
 Dictionary of American Naval Fighting Ships 
 
 Correspondence concerning the loss of LST-135

Ships built in Charleston, South Carolina
World War II amphibious warfare vessels of the United States
Ships sunk by kamikaze attack
Shipwrecks in the Philippine Sea
1944 ships
LSM-1-class landing ships medium
Maritime incidents in May 1945